Lassen Lodge is a hamlet in Tehama County, California, United States, located 36 miles east of Red Bluff. Latitude: 40.3454362 
Longitude: -121.7105392, Elevation: 4235 ft

Located along California Highway 36 between Paynes Creek and Mineral, Lassen Lodge consists of an old lodge building and cluster of cabins just off the highway on the rim of Battle Creek Canyon. For many decades this placewas a very lively mountain resort  on the Red bluff – Susanville highway (Highway 36).   Hunters, fishermen and recreationists traveled from all over Northern California to hunt the Tehama migratory deer herd, fish the creeks, ski in the winter, and enjoy the rugged beauty of this place.  Like many of the now forgotten travel lodges in the area, it is remembered as a place people would flock to for good times.  Particularly folks would gather for music and dances that would last until the sun came up over Turner Mountain. There were horseshoe pits, ping pong tables, card games (cribbage was the favorite), even slot machines to entertain the guests.  At one time there was a small school house and sawmill. Aside from the travelers, locals came from many miles around not only to eat, buy gas and groceries, but also to sell their fruits, vegetables, and handicrafts to the store. 
Although most of the known history of this place revolves around the time in which it was an operating resort, evidence suggests the locale was utilized by indigenous people and the earliest maps indicate this location has always been a waypoint for people traveling through the area. Lassen Lodge's location is very convenient and important for a couple of reasons; it is situated on a broad, relatively flat ridge that straddles both Battle Creek Canyon and the north fork of the Payne's Creek watershed at a critical pass that connected the valley foothills with the mountains. Situated at the timberline, very large, well spaced trees and little underbrush provided an open shady area ideal for cattle to rest, and travelers to camp.   Water was available from nearby springs that pour out of the side of the mountains, and at the turn of the century, "The Last Chance" ditch passed through this location carrying water from Battle Creek to the Champion Mill in Lyonsville. At 4,200 ft elevation, the weather is temperate, typically at the snowline during winter months and just above the heat in the summer.  The Tehama County Wagon Road, and eventually highway 36, passed through and intersected with the Belle Mill Rd (now Tramway Rd) at this location. This intersection sits at a logical rest spot on the road where eastbound travelers would have just climbed two very steep grades, first the Buckeye grade from Paynes Creek to the rim of Battle Creek Canyon, then the steep grade from Ponderosa road up to Lassen Lodge.

Early history of the region 

The Tehama County Wagon Road opened in 1862 to facilitate a trade route to the Idaho gold rush of the 1860s along with the westward settlement.  As the state was settled, it spurned development of its cities and towns, causing demand for lumber and agricultural goods like wool to soar.  To meet the demand, Tehama County, with its prime forests and range developed to become the export center of agricultural goods such as lumber and livestock.  Several lumber mills were developed along the western slope of the cascades, particularly around the town of Lyonsville which was approximately 4 miles away. Lassen Lodge was at the intersection of the road to Lyonsville and the new Tehama County Wagon road.  
As early as the 1860s, sheep and cattle ranching operations along with dairy farming became prominent enterprises in the local economy. Ranchers used the grasslands in the valley, foothills and high meadows to graze livestock. By the 1870s, Tehama County residents were traveling to the area around Battle Creek Meadows to hunt, fish, and escape the summer heat of the Sacramento Valley. The Tehama County Wagon Road provided good access to the area, making these recreational excursions by valley residents possible. With the topography being as it is, this location made a great camp for the weary teams that were depended upon for transportation in those days.

The development of this place 

As early history of the region developed, the area around Lassen Lodge was owned by the Federal Government. It was surveyed in 1880 and it was not until 1895 that the section on which Lassen Lodge sits was patented to the Central Pacific Railroad as payment for the completion of the California and Oregon railroad line segment from Roseville to the California/Oregon border.  
We can only speculate that this site was used for a camp by travelers, sheep and cattle drives, and lumbermen in these early days.

An auto camp 

The Model T was introduced in 1908 and it revolutionized society.  With its introduction, automobiles became available to most everyone.  It gave people the freedom to roam and had a major role in developing mountain tourism in Northern California. 
The earliest accounts of this place indicate a man named Henry M. (Slim) Jori began the commercial development of this place in the early 1920s. Jori's parents had just arrived from Switzerland when Jori was born in Sacramento in 1890. After a career as a machinist at a brewery in Sacramento, he decided, at age 27, to leave the city life and become a cowboy. He moved to Paynes Creek, and worked as superintendent of the RW Hanna stock ranch in Paynes Creek. Jori drove cattle through Lassen Lodge as it was roughly halfway between Hanna's Paynes Creek ranch and the Mill Creek Meadows ranches. This was a great resting spot for the cattle as they would have just climbed over 1000 feet in only a few miles. There was water, and huge troughs were built for the cattle to drink, and shade from the large trees that grow at this elevation. 
Henri Jori saw an opportunity, in 1912, there were one million registered vehicles but by 1923, there were some 15.2 million cars registered in the United States. Jori recognized the demand for services to these new travelers.   Auto camping became a fad. People would outfit their cars with camping equipment and just go.   These "tourists" viewed themselves as pioneers or adventurers. They relished the challenges of the road, seeing the "real" America on their own timetable, and stopping to camp whenever and wherever they wished. And the newly created Lassen National Park would have been the perfect destination for these new travelers. Commercial enterprises were developed early to appeal to the motorists—first tourist camps, then tourist cottages, then tourist courts, then motels. These were complemented by filling stations, gift shops, restaurants and attractions, all with convenient auto parking.
Jori set up a seasonal store and restaurant at this location in 1922, where he sold gas and other convenience items there during the summers. The store and restaurant consisted of a cabin and tent platform.   He could do this because he was one of the few owners of a truck, that he could transport the goods and gasoline in to this convenient location.  Jori's boss, RW Hanna was a director of the Standard Oil Company. Is it possible Hanna inspired or helped Jori in this business venture?  His wife Clara (Hurt) was the cook and she was well known for her biscuits and gravy. She was also the bookkeeper for RW Hanna. Clara told of an ongoing battle with the owners of Childs Meadow resort over a large rock at the side of the road that they would paint to advertise their services. Each party would paint over the others sign. The Joris homesteaded and lived down the road in the upper eastern portion of the current Mt Meadows Ranch. In another business venture of Jori's, he bought 2,000 Angora Goats, at which time, construction of Highway 36 was taking place. The construction included a lot of blasting, and the story is, the goats ate the blasting caps and for days there were goats exploding! Henri also traveled 5 days by train to Denver to bring back the first Domino Hereford cow in California.  Clara was also a very lively person who was known as the bird lady of California. She ran a huge bird sanctuary at the Mountain Meadow Ranch, a facility that reintroduced many indigenous birds back to the area.

Henry Jori died in 1932 at the age of 42 from a long illness of Black Lung Disease.  Jori's son Henry "Hank" O. Jori was a well known pilot and is the subject of the 2007 Tehama County Historical Society Memories article "Hank Jori, a Pilots Pilot". Through his fathers Standard Oil connection, Hank got a job at Standard Oil and saved up enough to purchase his first airplane.

Jiggs Camp 

Henry Jori's successor, Sylvanus Giles "Jiggs" Tully, was born in Missouri in 1868, and his family moved to Santa Clara in 1900. Tully was a charter member of the Masonic Lodge at Santa Clara. In 1912 he moved to Ceres to be a rancher, but after a few short years he was back in Santa Clara listed as retired in the 1916 census. By 1920 he had moved to Red Bluff and got his second wind. He was a farmer in Red Bluff, mechanic in Los Molinos, then service station owner in Los Molinos. In the late 1920s, he had taken what Jori had started and piped in water from a spring, built a log cabin store and service station. Jiggs named the Associated service station Jiggs Station and the place was known as "Jiggs Camp".  Jiggs Camp continued as an auto camp, meeting the needs of the auto travelers, the lumbermen and ranchers of the day.  Jiggs was a well liked man who would get up and feed and even play the guitar for the occasional late night customer.  Jiggs died in Dairyville in 1939. His obituary described him as a popular Diaryville Rancher.  
Sometime in the early 1930s Jiggs' daughter Sylvia and husband William (Bill) Swart moved from San Francisco to help Jiggs. Bill was born in Chicago, Illinois in 1889. His parents were from Switzerland.  His family moved to San Francisco between 1900 and 1910. In 1915 he married Sylvia Tully. He worked as a machinist and she as a dental nurse in San Francisco until arriving at Jiggs Camp permanently sometime prior to 1932.

Lassen Camp 

In the early 1930s, Bill Swart built a log cabin directly across the road from Jiggs camp. It had living quarters upstairs and a bar and restaurant on the ground floor. Signs on the building advertised a lunchroom, sandwiches and cold beer.   Next to this log cabin he built a small auto repair garage. Behind the restaurant he built a row of motel cabins.  He called this place Lassen Camp.

Lassen Lodge 
On Saturday December 23, 1939 Sylvia and Bill opened "Lassen Lodge" adjacent to Jiggs Station.  A December 18, 1939 Red Bluff Daily News article about the opening, read; "Of California mountain architecture, the structure comprises a coffee shop, tap room and rumpus room, all of spacious proportions…..Mrs. Swart planned the lodge and Bill and his men cut and sawed all the rough timber and lumber used with a small portable saw rig. They started to cut last May".  The new lodge was opened with a carnival entertainment sponsored by the Mt. Lassen Ski club." With the new lodge built, the bottom floor of the Lassen Camp log cabin was converted into a dance hall.  
A January 19, 1940 Red Bluff Daily News story of the 2nd anniversary celebration of Mr. and Mrs. H.S. Lace of Red Bluff at Lassen Lodge read " After a steak dinner the guests spent the evening playing games and enjoyed several musical numbers. The public address system recently installed in the Rumpus room at Lassen Lodge attracted much interest". 
Under the Swart's ownership the place really took off as a resort destination, not just a wayside stop for travelers. They came for relaxation and recreation, attracting visitors for holidays, vacations and special events.  
During several seasons of the year, Lassen Lodge resort bustled with tourists and workers, summertime with folks looking to get out of the heat, fall during the hunting season, and winter as Mineral and Lassen National park were popular for winter sports activities, especially skiing.
Lassen Lodge became popular with well to do sportsmen seeking the best hunting and fishing opportunities. Slowly private cabins began to be erected and many workers from the nearby National park and Forest Service also began to reside there as well.
The Swarts built a corral for cattle and when the ranchers drove their cattle through they would spend the night and eat at the restaurant. 
Sylvia Schwartz was known by everyone as an excellent cook.  She had planted an apple orchard at Lassen Camp across the street from Lassen Lodge and she had a reputation for making delicious apple pies. 
Between 1940 and 1943, Jiggs log gas station was rebuilt to match the Lassen Lodge building.

At some point during the early 1940s Lou and Florence Mendonsa, from Vallejo, ran the resort, and this experience in some way, prepared/motivated them to open The Triangle, a similar roadside development on highway 99 in Dairyville. Lou tended bar and did various other tasks in the restaurant, store, gas station and cabins and Florence made pies and cakes for the restaurant and waited on customers, as well as working the cash register in the store.  
The resort continued to gain a reputation for its amenities, good food and memorable dances. 
In the 1985 Memories article about Ethel Lesher, she tells of the Lesher Orchestra playing for dances at Jiggs Camp between 1928 and 1953. Ethel's memories at Jiggs Camp were of family affairs. There was dinner at midnight, then a dance until 3 a.m. and arrival home after daylight on Sundays. The Wilson family of Paynes Creek are said to have frequently played for the dances. People would come from surrounding communities and as far away as Red Bluff and Manton for these dances.
The resort began to show up in travel publications such as The Federal Writers' Project (FWP). FWP published the American Guide Series during the depression era.

In 1939, the FWP published "California: Guide to the Golden State" and this book contained, among other things, automobile tours of important attractions.

Tour 6A of the book titled, "Junction with US 395 Susanville Chester Mineral Red Bluff State 36", described Lassen Camp as a place with services such as cabins, saddle and pack horses, and guide services. The road through Lassen Lodge is described:  
The 1941 World Ski Book also listed Lassen Lodge as a lodging option for skiing at Mt. Lassen. It was also listed for a coffee shop, bar, dormitory and cabins in the 1949 World Ski book for accommodations near the Mt. Lassen ski area.

The Fairfield era – the heyday 

With Lassen Lodge on the map as an all season vacation destination, several businessmen from Fairfield became interested in the resort.  On December 6, 1944, the Swarts sold the property and business to Arthur Garben, and John Freitas of Fairfield who subsequently transferred title back and forth among a group of several partners including Joseph A. Gerevas. However the Swarts continued to be a part of the resort community with Sylvia baking her apple pies and tending to the grounds.  Bill died in 1950 in San Francisco.

When Garben and Gerevas sold the property in 1952, it was agreed to grant Sylvia Swart a life estate in the property.  She continued as a character at the resort for many years.  Her cabin burned down sometime in the 1960s.  The foundation, planter boxes and sidewalk still exist where her home once stood.

The resort consisted of the former Jiggs Camp, Lassen Camp and Lassen Lodge, all situated on a full section of land (640 acres).  These men were familiar with the resort as they had been coming to this area from Fairfield for decades to hunt deer.

Art Garben was a banker and politician, and was referred to as Mr. Fairfield in his day.  John Freitas was a member of the Freitas pioneer family who were among the original founders of Fairfield and Solano County.  Ultimately one of the partners, Joseph A. Gerevas, along with his wife Sophia took over operations of the resort. Joseph's daughter Eleanor (Sis) Raper and husband Lloyd Raper, of Berkeley, ran the resort.

This ownership group consisted of prominent businessmen, elected officials, city council members, a mayor, and a Solano County supervisor. These men desired to get their minds off their business issues and the politics that consumed their everyday lives. Lassen Lodge was the perfect place for these men to play, this was their weekend getaway. There were poker games, slot machines, good food, music, great hunting and fishing.  These men were in power when the Travis Air Force base was located in Fairfield. This event quickly and forever changed a small agricultural town into a military base boomtown. During their ownership, the hunting season became the busiest season, as hundreds would come up and fill up all the rooms and cabins and pitch tents.  During the summer there were ping pong tables and horseshoe pits set up outside around the resort for the guests enjoyment.  The bar continued to do well. Slot machines, card games, and cribbage were the activities in the lodge.

Joseph Gerevas' grandson Ron Geveras of San Diego lived there as a boy. Ron was playing in a little league baseball game when General Travis was killed at the Fairfield-Suisun airport.  Shortly thereafter, they renamed the airport "Travis Air Force Base". 
He tells of how his step father Lloyd, told him of witnessing lightning striking the same tree twice in a span of a few years. The tree was near the Tramway intersection with Highway 36.

Deer hunting was still the main reason that the Fairfield crowd would go to Lassen.  Bay area newspapers frequently reported on the deer hunts in the Lassen lodge area. The deer migrated from the north through Lassen Lodge down to Paynes Creek. Ron's mother and father, as well as other commuters, had to stop one evening on their return from Red Bluff for more than an hour on the highway to let thousands of deer cross the road in mass.  They did it every year until the '60s.

According to Ron, Joseph Gerevas was the oldest living native of Fairfield when he died at 91. As was Ron's mother, Sis Raper when she died at 86. The Gerevas family owned property at Lassen Lodge longer than anyone ....... almost 70 years.

After seven years of lively ownership, Garben and Gerevas began to sell off lots to their partners and friends. In June 1952, the first subdivision of the section resulted in a lot sold to Grover and Aurora Harlan. Two months later they sold another lot to Frank and Maude Martell, and the Garbin and Gerevas families also granted each other lots for their own private cabins. One lot went to one of the partners, Leo McInnis, for a case of whiskey.

Skinner / Goni decade – the waning of the heydays 

On November 20, 1952, Garben, Gerevas and Raper sold the resort to Charles and Edith Skinner and Robert and Marvelle Goni of Woodland CA.  This partnership remodeled all the cabins and added bathrooms to them. The lodge was remodeled with a portion of it converted to a gift shop.   Bob and Marvelle Goni were no strangers to the resort when they bought it. Bob was a boarder there of Bill Swart's in the 1930s while working at Lassen National Park and it was at Lassen Lodge that he met Marvelle in 1939. They were married within a month, and stayed together for 60 years when Bob died.  Business was very good for them especially during the hunting season.  "Diamond International" built a mill at Lyman Springs, and many of the workers came up for groceries, and to eat and patronize the bar.  The Gonis' loved to tell stories of the bears that frequented the restaurants' garbage cans every night, they rigged a light and when the bears would come, everyone in the restaurant would rush to the kitchen windows to see them.  After 10 years of ownership, The Gonis' sold. Bob moved the family to Red Bluff and opened the well known Bobs Sport Shop in Red Bluff. 
During this timeframe two other developments occurred which altered the destiny of this resort. In 1952, Caltrans began acquiring portions of the section in order to realign Highway 36. The plan was to avoid the cliffs to the east of Lassen Lodge which create the infamous suicide curves on Highway 36.  This was to be a controlled access freeway which would have effectively cut off direct access to Lassen Lodge from the road. Luckily, it was never built and the road was only improved in place, however the prospect of being further off the road and perhaps out of sight of motorists certainly must have upset Goni's confidence in the future of the business. 
More importantly, during this time was the opening of the CDF fire station in 1954.  From 1954 until being relocated to Paynes Creek in 2003, the Lassen Lodge station was manned to fight fires in the area. 
The construction of freeways along with improvements to the comfort and speed of the auto, created changes in consumer demands.  The individual cabins and motor courts diminished in popularity as one could now travel further and stay at comfortable motels, including the familiar brand-name chains of today.

1960s and '70s- Decades of decline
Mr. J.T. Bradley bought the resort and had grand plans for a new lodge on the Battle Creek Canyon rim. Bradley tore down Bill Swarts log cabin and some of the motel cabins.  He had a road built down into Battle Creek Canyon, however he failed to pay the laborers and they came one night and took a barrel of gasoline as collateral. Bradley caught them in the act and fired shots. He was arrested and spent time in jail for that incident, and the resort fell into disrepair and  he eventually lost the resort in foreclosure in the late 1960s to the Gonis' who then sold it in 1971 to Donald Choate and Ernest Lovisone.  The resort never opened during this time and continued to fall into disrepair.

1980s – Another try as a resort 

In 1978 it was sold to the Weissinger family, who remodeled the cabins and rented them for both long term and weekend use, but the main lodge building was never reopened and the gas station was eventually converted into a residential unit. The Wessingers enjoyed a decade of idyllic mountain living exploring the many acres in the Battle Creek Canyons and hosting many guests.  During that time the Tehama County Energy Authority conducted a study to develop a hydroelectric facility on Battle Creek within the Lassen Lodge property boundaries. The Wessingers, fearing the devastation of the scenic qualities of the canyon and creek, fought the proposal and eventually Tehama County withdrew its plans for the project. In the early 1990s the Wessingers decided to sell the property. A real estate agent informed an investor in Germany of the hydrologic potential on the property and it was purchased by Rugraw Inc. who held the property until 1998. Rugraw logged the land, and retained the hydroelectric rights and have recently submitted another
proposal.
to build a powerhouse on Battle Creek.
There are currently approximately seven owners who own lots in the original section of land.
Each lot and cabin has its own story and memories.
In 2008, Ron Gerevas sold the cabin that had been in his family for nearly 70 years. The owner of the remainder of the section which includes the lodge building and several cabins, has turned the property into a facility to raise stock horses.  
Today, Lassen Lodge is fortunate to still have its roadside culture intact to tell a part of the history of the early Auto Age.
The cabins, motor court, restaurant, and gas station are a part of the history of Tehama County.
Lassen Lodge represents an exciting time in American culture, one of new-found freedom to take a road trip and explore on one's own schedule, no longer at the mercy of a stagecoach or train schedule.
Lassen Lodge provided many people, over many decades, a place to escape the summer heat, hear music in the mountains, and spend quality time with family and friends.

External links 
Calisphere search for Lassen Lodge photos
Calisphere search for Jiggs Station photos

References 

Unincorporated communities in California
Unincorporated communities in Tehama County, California